Brown Deer Middle/High School is a high school on North 60th Street, Brown Deer, Wisconsin, USA. It serves approximately 800 students in grades 7 through 12.

Sports
The school's sports teams are known as "The Falcons". The school is part of the Woodland Conference. Formerly in the Parkland Conference, the Falcons moved to the Woodland Conference after the 2005–2006 school year. Their most recent state championship was in boys' track in 2008, and their most recent conference championship was in boys' football during the 2010–2011 season, with recent conference championships in boys' football and basketball in 2007–2008. The undefeated football team won the Parkland Conference Championship in 2004. The Falcons' rival schools are Pewaukee, New Berlin Eisenhower, and Greendale.

Notable alumni
Dan Harmon, television producer
Steve Novak, professional basketball player and announcer for the Milwaukee Bucks
Diane Sykes, federal judge
Streetz-n-Young Deuces, Hip-Hop Group
Zack Baun, professional football player for the New Orleans Saints

References

External links
 

Public high schools in Wisconsin
Schools in Milwaukee County, Wisconsin